Brăești is a commune in Botoșani County, Western Moldavia, Romania. It is composed of four villages: Brăești, Poiana, Popeni and Vâlcelele.

References

Communes in Botoșani County
Localities in Western Moldavia